Novosphingobium lentum  is a Gram-negative, rod-shaped, non-spore-forming, psychrotolerant and non-motile bacterium from the genus Novosphingobium which has been isolated from chlorophenol-contaminated groundwater in Finland. Novosphingobium lentum has the ability to degrade chlorophenol.

References

External links
Type strain of Novosphingobium lentum at BacDive -  the Bacterial Diversity Metadatabase	

Bacteria described in 2005
Sphingomonadales
Psychrophiles